Aichatou Sar Evans (born 1969), known professionally as Aicha Evans, is an American chief executive officer of Amazon's self-driving car subsidiary Zoox. In June 2020, Evans led the acquisition of her company by Amazon for US$1.3 billion.

Early life and education 
Evans was born in Senegal and spent her childhood in Paris. After immigrating to the United States, she studied at The George Washington University in Washington, D.C., where she received a bachelor's degree in Computer Engineering in 1996.

Career 
Evans has held engineering management positions at companies including Rockwell Semiconductor, Conexant, and Skyworks Solutions.

Evans joined Intel in 2006, and spent 12 years with the firm, specializing in leading wireless engineering projects utilizing technologies like Bluetooth, Wireless LAN, XMM register, and 5G. In 2013, Evans assumed leadership of a communications and devices division with more than 7,000 employees. In 2017, Evans was promoted to Chief Strategy Officer. In a Federal Trade Commission case against Qualcomm, Evans served as a witness alleging unfair business practices and potential anti-trust violations.

In February 2019, Evans joined Zoox as its new CEO. In doing so, she became the first Senegalese-American female CEO of an autonomous vehicle technology company. In June 2020, Evans led the acquisition of her company by Amazon for US$1.3 billion. A Forbes analysis suggests that Evans' decision to pursue aggressive patent coverage in the mobility space led to Amazon's interest. Evans will continue to manage the company as a stand-alone business post-acquisition.

Volunteer and community work 
Evans serves as a trustee for the Anita Borg Institute for Women & Technology.  She was a co-signatory of an open letter written by the Silicon Valley Leadership Group addressing racial intolerance of Chinese Americans in the wake of the COVID-19 pandemic.

Honors and awards 

 2019: Named to Business Insiders list of 100 People Transforming Business in the transportation category
 George Washington University Engineering Hall of Fame
 Evans was selected for the inaugural 2021 Forbes 50 Over 50; made up of entrepreneurs, leaders, scientists and creators who are over the age of 50.

References 

1969 births
Living people
Senegalese emigrants to the United States
21st-century American businesspeople
American technology chief executives